Yuanxing may refer to:

Chinese era
Yuanxing (元興) was a Chinese era name used by several emperors of China. It may refer to:

Yuanxing (105), era name used by Emperor He of Han
Yuanxing (264–265), era name used by Sun Hao, emperor of Eastern Wu
Yuanxing (402–404), era name used by Emperor An of Jin

Beef cattle
Yuanxing (beef cattle) (源興牛), an original Tajima strain's breed of Taiwanese beef cattle.